The Rímac River is located in western Peru and is the most important source of potable water for the Lima and Callao Metropolitan Area.

The river is part of the Pacific watershed and has a length of 204 km. The river begins in the highlands of the Huarochirí Province in the Lima Region and its mouth is located in Callao, near Jorge Chávez International Airport.

The name Rímac is from the Quechua word rimaq, meaning "speaker, speaking", leading to it being nicknamed El Río Hablador ("the talking river").

See also
List of rivers of Peru
List of rivers of the Americas by coastline

References

Rivers of Peru
Rivers of Lima Region